Tzachi Zamir (born 1967) is an Israeli philosopher and literary critic specialising in the philosophy of literature, the philosophy of theatre, and animal ethics. He is Professor of English and General & Comparative Literature at the Hebrew University of Jerusalem.

Academic career
Zamir studied at the Hebrew University of Jerusalem and Tel-Aviv University, going on to be a Rothschild and Fulbright postdoctoral fellow in philosophy at The University of Chicago. He joined the English department of the Hebrew University of Jerusalem in 2004 as a lecturer, and is now Professor of English and General & Comparative Literature.

Zamir is the author of the 2006 book Double Vision: Moral Philosophy and Shakespearean Drama and the 2007 book Ethics & the Beast: A Speciesist Argument for Animal Liberation, both published by Princeton University Press. His 2014 book Acts: Theater, Philosophy, and the Performing Self was published by the University of Michigan Press. In 2018, he published both the monograph Ascent: Philosophy and Paradise Lost and the edited collection Shakespeare's Hamlet: Philosophical Perspectives with Oxford University Press, and in 2020 he published Just Literature: Philosophical Criticism and Justice with Routledge.

While most contemporary scholars involved with animal ethics have written in favour of veganism, Zamir however has defended vegetarianism.

Personal life
Zamir lives with his wife and three children in Hod HaSharon.

Selected publications

 "Veganism" (Journal of Social Philosophy, 2004)
 Double Vision: Moral Philosophy and Shakespearean Drama (Princeton University Press, 2006)
 Ethics & the Beast: A Speciesist Argument for Animal Liberation (Princeton University Press, 2007)
 "Killing for Pleasure" (Between the Species, 2011)
 Acts: Theater, Philosophy, and the Performing Self (University of Michigan Press, 2014)
 Ascent: Philosophy and Paradise Lost (Oxford University Press, 2018)
 Just Literature: Philosophical Criticism and Justice (Routledge, 2020)

References

External links

https://tzachizamir.huji.ac.il/

1967 births
Living people
Animal ethicists
Animal rights scholars
Israeli ethicists
Israeli literary critics
Israeli philosophers
Jewish philosophers
Hebrew University of Jerusalem alumni
Academic staff of the Hebrew University of Jerusalem
Literary critics of English
People from Hod HaSharon
Philosophers of literature
Shakespearean scholars
Tel Aviv University alumni
Theatrologists
Vegetarianism activists